Ectoedemia albida is a moth of the family Nepticulidae. It is only known from southern Turkmenistan and northern Iran.

The wingspan is about 7.4 mm. Adults are on the wing in April and May.

The hostplant is unknown, but it is probably a Populus species.

External links
Western Palaearctic Ectoedemia (Zimmermannia) Hering and Ectoedemia Busck s. str. (Lepidoptera, Nepticulidae): five new species and new data on distribution, hostplants and recognition

Nepticulidae
Moths of Asia
Moths described in 1994